Kodal Church is a long church located in Kodal in the municipality of Sandefjord in Vestfold og Telemark county, Norway. The church is the parish church for Kodal.

Its chancel dates from the 12th century. The nave dates from 1691 and is made of round timbers. The altarpiece dates from 1781, and the painting Jesus and the Disciples on the Walk to Emmaus by Otto Valstad is painted in the style of Anton Dorph and is from 1899.

Kodal Church was mentioned in written sources for the first time in 1339. In 1893 Kodal Church received its first organ, and in 1919 new bells from the Olsen Nauen Bell Foundry.

References

External links
 Kodal Church at the Church of Norway
 Kirkesøk: Kodal Church
 Kodal Church at Kulturminnesøk

12th-century churches in Norway
Churches in Vestfold og Telemark
Stone churches in Norway